España y Filipinas (“Spain and the Philippines") is a series of oil on wood paintings by Filipino painter, Ilustrado, and revolutionary activist, Juan Luna. It is an allegorical depiction of two women together, one a representation of Spain and the other of the Philippines. The painting, also known as España Guiando a Filipinas ("Spain Leading the Philippines"), is regarded as one of the “enduring pieces of legacy” that the Filipinos inherited from Luna.

Luna reportedly painted six versions of España y Filipinas, with the best-known version, painted in 1886, being a centerpiece art at the Luna Hall of the López Museum and Library. Another version, painted in 1884, is part of the collection of the National Gallery Singapore, while a third version, the largest of the series, was painted in 1888 and is part of the collection of the Museo del Prado in Madrid, with the piece being loaned on a long-term basis to the City Council of Cádiz.

Description
The Spaniard woman “Motherland" was drawn with “wide strong shoulders” while the Filipino woman was illustrated as “graceful” and brown-skinned. Both were wearing female dresses known as traje de mestiza or "dress of the mestiza". The dressing of the women in traje de mestizas shows the cultural character, class consciousness, and social transformations resulting from 19th century Hispanization. Both women have their backs to the viewer, heading towards a far-away horizon, while embarking on the steps of a staircase. Side by side in the painting, Spain was shown to be leading the Philippines along the path to progress and development.

The taller and maternal white figure of a woman is Spain, a representation of the "benevolent image of colonialism", is pointing ahead and guiding the "humbly dressed" Filipina to the "right way". The painting appeared in the book entitled El legado de España a Filipinas or "the Spanish legacy in the Philippines" with the accompanying caption stating: España guiando a Filipinas por la senda del progreso (“Spain leads the Philippines on their way to progress”). It is further described as a painting that once linked the colonized with its former colonists, a "bucolic allegory" of the master and the servant "walking hand in hand".

Historical significance
Although an oil on canvas masterpiece that projected a close bond between Spain and the Philippines through feminine figures, it is a propaganda painting that revealed the true hope and desire of Filipino propagandists during the 19th-century: assimilation with Spain, reform, equality, modernization, and economic improvement. Contrary to Jose Rizal’s estimation that Luna was a “Hispanophile”, or a person who could never go against Spain, the España y Filipinas portrait is a “less combative posture” of Luna for showing to Spain and the viewers of the painting the needs of the Philippines at the time.

See also
Spoliarium
Las Damas Romanas
The Death of Cleopatra
The Blood Compact

References

External links
Juan Luna painting collection at lopez-museum.org

1886 paintings
Paintings by Juan Luna
History of the Philippines (1565–1898)
Paintings in the Philippines
Philippine paintings